Janet Howell Clark (January 1, 1889 – February 12, 1969) was an American physiologist and biophysicist.

Early life and education 
Clark was born Janet Howell on January 1, 1889, in Baltimore, Maryland, the daughter of Anne Janet Tucker and William Henry Howell, a professor of physiology at Johns Hopkins University and director of Johns Hopkins School of Hygiene and Public Health. She attended Bryn Mawr School, a Quaker school in Pennsylvania, graduating top of her class in 1906 and winning a scholarship to attend Bryn Mawr College where she majored in physics. In 1913 she received her PhD in physics from Johns Hopkins University. She began her career teaching physics at Bryn Mawr in 1914.

Personal life 
In 1917, Janet Howell married Dr. Admont Halsey Clark, a professor in Pathology at Johns Hopkins University Medical School, who died in 1918 at age 30 due to Spanish influenza epidemic. The couple had one daughter.

Academic career 
On her husband's death she returned to live with her parents, accepting a position in the Department of Physiology at Johns Hopkins School of Hygiene and Public Health, where she focused on the effects of radiation on human eyesight, beginning as an instructor in physiological hygiene before becoming an associate in 1923. She had a particular interest in visible and ultraviolet light, infrared light, and X-ray radiation. 

American Association of University Women

In 1938, she became dean of the Women's College and professor of biological sciences at the University of Rochester.

References 

1889 births
1969 deaths
Bryn Mawr College alumni
Johns Hopkins University alumni
Bryn Mawr College faculty
University of Rochester faculty